Bhutta College of Education is a co-educational teaching college that was established in 2006 in Ludhiana, Punjab, India. It is run by Keharnam Memorial Educational Society (Regd.). The college is NAAC accredited with CGPA 2.75.

The college offers a Bachelor of Education with twelve different streams. Classes are taught in English, Hindi and Punjabi.

External links
 http://www.bcedldh.org/

References

Universities and colleges in Punjab, India
Education in Ludhiana
Educational institutions established in 2006
2006 establishments in Punjab, India